Kobeliaky is a city in Poltava Oblast, Ukraine. It serves as the administrative center of Kobeliaky Raion. Population:

History
During World War II,  Kobeliaky was under German occupation from 15 September 1941 until 25 September 1943.

Climate

Notable people
 Nikolai Timofeyevich Gres, soloist with the Bolshoi Theatre and the Alexandrov Ensemble
 Alexander Davydov, opera singer
 Alexey Ivakhnenko, academician, mathematician
 Hryhory Kytasty, composer, conductor
 Georgy Prokopenko (1937–2021), swimmer
  (1886-1973), actor

Gallery

References

External links
 Kobeliaky
 Photogallery of the Kobeliaky city
 History of Kobeliaky city (in Ukrainian language)
 The murder of the Jews of Kobeliaky during World War II, at Yad Vashem website.

Cities in Poltava Oblast
Kobelyaksky Uyezd
Cities of district significance in Ukraine
Holocaust locations in Ukraine